Bucculatrix infans is a moth in the family Bucculatricidae. It was described by Otto Staudinger in 1880. It is found on the Balkan Peninsula and in Ukraine and Turkey. 

The wingspan is about 7 mm.

The larvae feed on Centaurea triniifolia. They mine the leaves of their host plant. Larvae can be found in July. They are olive green.

References

Natural History Museum Lepidoptera generic names catalog

Bucculatricidae
Moths described in 1880
Taxa named by Otto Staudinger
Moths of Europe
Leaf miners